Martin Hladík (born 16 August 1953) is a Czech rower. He competed in the men's coxed four event at the 1980 Summer Olympics.

References

1953 births
Living people
Czech male rowers
Olympic rowers of Czechoslovakia
Rowers at the 1980 Summer Olympics
Rowers from Prague